Simonis is both a surname and a given name. Notable people with the name include:

Adrianus Johannes Simonis, Dutch Roman Catholic cardinal and former archbishop of Utrecht
Eugène Simonis or Eugen Simonis, Belgian sculptor and architect
Heide Simonis, German politician
Kazys Šimonis, Lithuanian artist
Simonis Palaiologina, Byzantine princess and third wife of Stefan Uroš II Milutin of Serbia
Simonis Starovolsci, Polish scholar

See also
Simono, a Native American group that lived in Nuevo León and later in eastern Texas.

Surnames from given names